Paul Bécart de Granville et de Fonville (January 18, 1695 – March 19, 1754) was an officer in the colonial regular troops and a seigneur.

Bécart de Fonville, was the brother of Charles Bécart de Granville et de Fonville, a king’s attorney. He entered military service in 1712 and had achieved the rank of captain by April, 1737. In 1733 he had received the seigneury of Île aux Grues.

In 1743 Paul Bécart became commandant of Fort Saint Frédéric on Lake Champlain. He replaced François-Antoine Pécaudy de Contrecœur. In 1750 he was made a knight of the order of Saint-Louis particularly because of his service at Fort Saint Frédéric.

External links 

 

People of New France
1695 births
1754 deaths
Knights of the Order of Saint Louis